"Everybody Dies" is the series finale of the American medical drama television series House. It is the 22nd episode of the eighth season and the 177th overall episode of the series. It originally aired on Fox in the United States on May 21, 2012. While treating a drug-addicted patient, House is forced to examine his life and future.

The series finale aired immediately following "Swan Song", a two-hour retrospective episode. The episode featured cameos from multiple characters in previous seasons, including Remy "Thirteen" Hadley, Allison Cameron, Martha Masters, Dominika Petrova, and Stacy Warner, as well as Lawrence Kutner and Amber Volakis, who both died in previous seasons but appeared as hallucinations. The episode was watched by 8.72 million U.S. viewers and received mixed critical reception.

Plot
House wakes up next to a dead body in an abandoned building that is slowly burning down. He starts to hallucinate about former and deceased colleagues and realizes he is arguing with his own subconscious about whether he should escape or die in the fire. Flashbacks show that in the days prior, House took up the case of Oliver, a heroin addict. Oliver overheard that House is facing felony vandalism charges, and had offered to take the blame for House as he believed he was about to die, but House realized that Oliver will likely live. In the present, House recognizes the dead body as Oliver.

Meanwhile, Wilson and Foreman have not seen House for several days. Discovering that Oliver is also missing from the hospital, they suspect House may have gone with him to take heroin. They track down Oliver's address, and see 
a burning building nearby; just as they see that House is trapped inside, the building explodes. A coroner confirms from dental records that a burnt body from the building is House's.

A funeral is held for House. While most people call House a positive force in their lives, Wilson calls House arrogant and says that he never cared for his friends. Suddenly, a phone in Wilson's pocket rings, with the text message "SHUT UP YOU IDIOT". Wilson finds House waiting at his home. House admits he switched his dental records with his patient in order to fake his own death; astonished, Wilson states that House just destroyed his life, he will go to jail and will never be able to practice medicine again. House replies, "I'm dead, Wilson", and asks him how he would like to spend his last months before he dies from terminal cancer.

The final scenes include a montage of House's colleagues. Chase replaced House as Head of Diagnostic Medicine, with Adams and Park working with him. Taub is at a restaurant spending time with Rachel, Ruby and his daughters. Cameron returns to work as the head of the emergency room in a Chicago hospital. She gazes at a photo of the old team before leaving to join her husband and child. Foreman discovers House's hospital ID stuck under a table leg in his office, which he had previously complained to House about and chuckles, realizing that House is alive. The final scene shows House and Wilson traveling the country on motorcycles.

Production

In March 2012 Amber Tamblyn was confirmed to reprise her role as Martha Masters for the finale.  Anne Dudek, Sela Ward and Andre Braugher also reprised their previous roles as Amber, Stacy Warner and Dr. Nolan respectively. In April, it was announced that David Shore would direct and co-write the final episode of the show and that Olivia Wilde would return as Thirteen for the penultimate episode and the series finale. It was also reported Kal Penn would return as Dr. Kutner and Jennifer Morrison would return to the series in a cameo appearance as Dr. Cameron. Lisa Edelstein, who played Dr. Lisa Cuddy in the first seven seasons of House, did not return for the series finale.

Many endings were considered for the finale of the series. The writers had considered killing House at one point, but settled for an ending where Wilson got sick, though the storyline was decided on at the beginning of the season. The episode also mirrors a Sherlock Holmes story where Holmes fakes his death. Laurie suggested the song "Enjoy Yourself (It's Later than You Think)" for the final scene. In interviews after the episode aired, Shore said that the fire was caused by Oliver falling asleep while smoking, and House had managed to escape the building in the few seconds between the collapse and the explosion. Chase has a minimal role in the finale, since the writers wanted to focus on the relationship between House and Wilson.

Shore told Entertainment Weekly that the series finale is "a different kind of episode, but at its core I think it's still a House episode... I really wanted to make sure that we're doing that at the end and we're still happy. As Hugh Laurie says, Dr. House is the guy who leaves the party before people want him to." Other cast members agreed that it was time for the show to end; Omar Epps, who played Eric Foreman, said "You want to go out at a time when the show is still effective, people are still watching it, the stories are still fresh... I think we've run our course. It's the right time."

The title of the episode, "Everybody Dies", is a reference to the title of the pilot episode, "Everybody Lies", a line commonly said by House.

Broadcast
The episode aired on May 21, 2012, immediately following a two-hour retrospective episode, Swan Song. The finale drew in an audience of 8.72 million in the US, finishing first on its hour and third on the night. Its 18-49 rating was 2.9, which was tied for second place on the night. In the US, "Everybody Dies" finished eighth in the week for adults 18–49 and finished eleventh overall. In Canada, the series finale finished third in the weekly viewership with 2.13 million viewers. In the United Kingdom, the episode had 688,000 viewers upon airing.

Reception
The episode received mixed critical reception. Some critics felt the episode was a fitting ending giving proper closure to the series. Lisa Palmer of TV Fanatic gave the finale an excellent rating of 4.8/5 and stated that "I feel satisfaction at this ending... I can move on from this show without hesitation," similar to Morgan Jeffery of Digital Spy, who stated "'Everybody Dies' probably won't go down in TV history as one of the great series finales, but it does get a hell of a lot right. House gets his happy ending with Wilson and, perhaps more importantly, there's the implication that he'll be okay once his friend is gone." Ken Tucker of Entertainment Weekly wrote that "House had, in its final seasons, become a rather sentimental show" and the final episode was a "satisfying" and "fitting ending".

Some critics were less positive. Zack Handlen of The A.V. Club awarded the episode a D+ rating, stating: "'Everybody Dies' is a failure of ambition." Handlen also criticized the direction the show had been going in over the last seasons, writing "then at some point, the soul floated away, and the writers were forced to push harder and harder to make us feel anything at all." Similar sentiments were shared by Vultures Margaret Lyons who wrote, "More than a hospital drama or a character piece or anything else, House is a complex meditation on misery, but there is a line between "enlightened cynicism" and "misery-entropy". As the show wore on, its dramatic flare dimmed while its agony flare burned ever brighter." She concluded that "it's hard not to wish that the show was going out on more of a high note, rather than the middle-range note it's been playing, and playing, and playing, for years."

Entertainment Weekly ranked House faking his death at number three for "Single Most Clever Twist" for the 2012 TV Season Finale Awards.

References

External links 

"Everybody Dies" at Fox.com

House (season 8) episodes
2012 American television episodes
American television series finales
Television episodes about funerals
Television episodes about suicide
Fiction with unreliable narrators